The Elceğiz Tunnel is a road tunnel constructed on the Tirebolu–Gümüşhane state highway  in Gümüşhane Province, northeastern Turkey. It was opened to traffic in 1998.

The -long single-tube tunnel carrying one lane of traffic in each direction is situated near Elceğiz village in Kürtün district. It is part of a series of 20 tunnels in various lengths in the Harşit River valley.

References

Road tunnels in Turkey
Transport in Gümüşhane Province